Black Widow is a 1987 American neo-noir thriller film directed by Bob Rafelson, from a screenplay by Ronald Bass. It stars Debra Winger, Theresa Russell, Sami Frey, and Nicol Williamson. Dennis Hopper has a short role at the beginning of the film.

It is a crime drama about two women: one who murders wealthy men whom she has married for their money (and keeps moving west), and the other an agent with the Department of Justice who grows obsessed with bringing her to justice.

Plot
After Manhattan publishing magnate Sam Peterson apparently dies of Ondine's curse, a condition in which seemingly healthy middle-aged men die in their sleep of respiratory failure, his younger wife of six months, Catharine, inherits his estate. Several months later, Catharine relocates to Dallas, Texas, posing as a Southern belle named "Marielle." She seduces Ben Dumers, the owner of a toy company, and the two marry. Shortly after, she poisons a bottle of expensive liquor, which kills him. After Ben's death, his sister Etta unsuccessfully attempts to contest his will, but is silenced by Catharine's gift of $500,000.

Meanwhile, Alexandra, a Justice Department agent in Washington, D.C., takes note of the similarities in both cases and begins investigating them. Through photographic comparisons of the men's brides, Alexandra determines it to be the same woman. Catharine moves on to Seattle, where she presents herself as a poised sophisticate named Margaret, and begins studying ancient history, especially Pacific Northwest native culture and Roman coins. At a local museum, she impresses William Macauley, a wealthy curator, with her knowledge, and buys her way onto the board of directors. She and William begin dating, and begin a whirlwind romance that leads to marriage. Catharine takes note of William's allergy to penicillin.

Alexandra begins interviewing the friends and families of Catharine's victims, first Sara, Sam's assistant, and next, Etta. Presenting her research to her superior, Bruce, Alexandra convinces him to send her on an investigative trip to Seattle, where she has tracked Catharine, who is now living with William at a rustic home on Bainbridge Island. Alexandra poses as a freelance reporter at the museum, claiming to be writing a story on powerful women, and inquiring about his wife, Margaret. William tells her his wife is private and will likely decline an interview. Shortly after, Catharine goes to the doctor complain of recurring bouts with tonsillitis, and is prescribed penicillin, which she mixes into William's toothpaste. The penicillin triggers a fatal heart attack, but his autopsy shows nothing unusual.

Determined to bring Catharine to justice, Alexandra trails her to Hawaii, where she fled after William's death. In Hawaii, Catharine, going by the name Renni Walker, seduces Paul Nuytten, a French hotelier. Alexandra, posing as "Jessica Bates", enrolls in a scuba diving class Catharine is taking, and the two partner during lessons. Alexandra ingratiates herself to Catharine, and the two become friendly. However, after Catharine observes Alexandra and Mr. Shin meeting in public, she grows suspicious. Catharine subsequently learns from Sara that Alexandra interviewed her several months prior in New York.

Several days later, Alexandra and Catharine go diving together, and Catharine saves Alexandra when her scuba gear apparently malfunctions. Catharine confides in Alexandra that she amassed her wealth from marrying rich men. She also encourages Alexandra to pursue Paul, whom she suspects has a crush on her. While Alexandra and Paul spend an afternoon alone at Catharine's encouragement, Catharine breaks into Alex's apartment and hires Shin to stalk her; he soon takes photos of Alexandra and Paul kissing. Confronting Alexandra with the photos, Catharine pretends to be upset. A short time later, Paul and Catharine are married.

Alexandra arrives at the wedding and accuses Catharine of manipulating her. She gifts Catharine a black widow necklace. Catharine responds by kissing her. Later, Catharine visits Shin and, holding him at gunpoint, forces him to administer himself a lethal overdose of heroin. In Shin's office, police find the photos of Paul and Alexandra. While Catharine goes on a trip to San Francisco, Alexandra confronts Paul with her investigation against Catharine. Paul informs Alexandra that his will declares that his entire estate go to the Cancer Foundation. When Paul subsequently dies, police arrest Alexandra after finding poison Catharine planted in her apartment.

At the reading of Paul's will, his attorney reveals that, because his legal state of residence was Florida, his bequest to charity is invalidated because it was made in the past six months. Catharine visits Alexandra in jail and taunts her. Moments later, Sara enters the visiting area, followed by Paul, who is in fact not dead, having faked his death to entrap Catharine. Catharine attempts to kiss him, but he refuses her, after which she is arrested.

Cast

Reception
Film4 notes that Black Widow succeeds through Rafelson's "menacing direction" and Debra Winger's "convincing struggle with temptation," while Theresa Russell "steals the show as the sexily assured devil sitting on her tracker's shoulder."

Vincent Canby of The New York Times writes that while the film promises more than it can deliver, its classy looks make it both soothing and "redeemingly funny, in part, at least, for not becoming mired in its own darker possibilities." He praises Winger for "the gift of seeming always to have hidden reserves of feeling that might erupt in chaos at any minute," while Russell "comes into her own" in the film, and has "a clear-eyed sweetness that adds unexpected dimension to the homicidal Catharine."

Roger Ebert gave Black Widow a mixed rating of 2.5 out of 4 stars, praising the performances by the main actors yet lamenting that "The movie makes no effort to keep us in suspense," by revealing too much early on about Russell's character.

As of February 2023, Black Widow holds a rating of 54% on Rotten Tomatoes based on 24 reviews.

See also
 Black Widow (2007 film)

References

External links
 
 Black Widow at Channel 4 Film
 Rewind... Black Widow at Fast Rewind
 

1987 films
1987 crime films
1987 thriller films
1980s American films
1980s crime thriller films
1980s English-language films
1980s erotic thriller films
1980s serial killer films
20th Century Fox films
American crime thriller films
American erotic thriller films
American neo-noir films
American serial killer films
Films directed by Bob Rafelson
Films produced by Laurence Mark
Films scored by Michael Small
Films set in Hawaii
Films set in Seattle
Films set in Washington, D.C.
Films shot in Hawaii
Films shot in Washington (state)
Films with screenplays by Ronald Bass
Mariticide in fiction